Balacra rubricincta. is a moth of the family Erebidae. It was described by William Jacob Holland in 1893. It is found in Angola, Cameroon, the Republic of the Congo, the Democratic Republic of the Congo, Equatorial Guinea, Gabon, Ghana, Ivory Coast, Kenya, Nigeria and Uganda.

References

Balacra
Moths described in 1893
Erebid moths of Africa